The Bus Services Act 2017 (c. 21) is an Act of the Parliament of the United Kingdom. It provides for local transport authorities to create partnership schemes to improve bus services in their areas, and to introduce advanced ticketing schemes.
The Act also provides for mayoral combined authorities to partially re-regulate bus services by creating franchise schemes similar to the one operated by Transport for London. It, however, prohibits local authorities from reversing complete bus deregulation by forming a company for the purpose of providing local services.

Franchising schemes

Greater Manchester 
The Mayor of Greater Manchester announced on 13 December 2017 that, following regulations laid down by the Secretary of State for Transport under the Act coming in to effect the following week, Greater Manchester would become the first city-region to start the process of bus franchising by requesting data from bus operators.

On 24 June 2019, Transport for Greater Manchester proposed that a bus franchise system was the region's preferred option. The Greater Manchester Combined Authority accepted the assessment on 28 June 2019 and instructed independent auditors to provide a report as required by the Act.

Following on from the audit, the GMCA announced a public consultation on the combined authority's plans for its franchising scheme on 7 October 2019, with the consultation running for three months and closing in January 2020. The consultation closed on 8 January 2020, with more than 8,000 responses with the results and a final decision on the scheme planned for publication by March 2020. In June 2020 the GMCA announced that 83% of consultation respondents supported the proposed franchise scheme, however the COVID-19 pandemic's impact on bus services prompted them to carry out an additional consultation running from 2 December 2020 until the 29 January 2021. In March 2021 the GMCA announced that 82% of respondents to the second consultation supported the franchising scheme.

On 25 March 2021 Andy Burnham announced the decision that buses in Greater Manchester would be franchised following nine of the ten local authority members of the GMCA voting in favour of the scheme.

Franchised services will be introduced in three phases over two years, starting with Bolton, Salford and Wigan on 17 September 2023, with subsequent areas being franchised over the course of 2024.

Legal Challenges

The plans to franchise bus services in the Greater Manchester area were criticised by both the Rotala Group and Stagecoach Group, with Rotala taking the case to Judicial Review, a process under which executive, legislative and administrative actions are subject to review by the judiciary. Rotala operator Diamond Bus North West launched a website which stated that £20 million has already gone on consultants towards the bus franchising proposals.

In March 2022 the franchising system was judged by the courts to be lawful, with both Stagecoach and Rotala stating they were disappointed by the decision.

The Judge, Mr Justice Julian Knowles, stated in his decision that he was not "persuaded the impugned decisions were either unlawful or irrational". Stagecoach accepted Mr Justice Knowles’ decision and has not sought leave to appeal, however Rotala later appealed against the decision of the courts. On 25 July 2022 the Court of Appeal dismissed the appeal.

Bus Open Data

The Bus Services Act required the Department for Transport to work with operators to provide Open Data systems for bus timetables, fares and vehicle locations in England.

This requirement was implemented by the Bus Open Data Service with a requirement for operators to provide AVL, timetable and basic fare information by January 2021 and Local Authorities to provide stop data by December 2020.

Implementations

A small number of websites have included Bus Open Data information including:

 Bustimes.org - A website which has implemented timetable, stop, fares and vehicle location data

Criticism

Despite providing fare, time and vehicle location, the Department for Transport has ruled out including key accessibility information on bus stops, stations and vehicles despite the Bus Services Act making specific provision for open data, 'for the purpose of facilitating travel by disabled persons'.

References 

United Kingdom Acts of Parliament 2017
2017 in transport
Transport policy in the United Kingdom
History of transport in the United Kingdom
Transport legislation
Bus Services Act 2017